Walter Rutherford may refer to:

 Walter Rutherford (footballer) (1891–1944), Scottish footballer
 Walter Rutherford (golfer) (1857–1913), Scottish golfer
 Walter Rutherford Peterson Jr. (1922–2011), American educator and politician

See also
 Walter Rutherfurd (1723–1804), Scottish-American soldier and merchant